Salyi Lolaku Samuel is a South Sudanese professional football manager. He was named as caretaker manager of the South Sudan national football team for the friendly game versus Botswana in March 2014.

References

External links

Year of birth missing (living people)
Living people
South Sudanese football managers
South Sudan national football team managers
Place of birth missing (living people)